Mallwyd is a small village at the most southern end of Gwynedd, Wales in the Dinas Mawddwy community, in the valley of the River Dyfi. It lies on the A470 approximately halfway between Dolgellau and Machynlleth, and forms the junction of the A458 towards Welshpool. The nearest villages are Dinas Mawddwy, two miles to the north, and Aberangell a similar distance to the south. The River Dugoed flows into the River Dyfi near the village.

History
The village is situated near the boundary between the historic counties of Merionethshire and Montgomeryshire. The village is situated in the parish of Mallwyd in the district of Mawddwy. This was the region of the Red Bandits of Mawddwy, which is remembered in the village pub, The Brigands.

Railway
In 1867, the Mawddwy Railway was opened, connecting Dinas Mawddwy with Cemmaes Road. A small station was provided to serve Mallwyd, though it was nearly a mile from the village. Passenger services on the railway were withdrawn in 1931, and the railway closed and was lifted in 1952.

The Church

According to tradition, Mallwyd church was founded in the 6th century by Saint Tydecho after he came to the area from Cornwall. The present building dates from the 14th century and is unusual in form, being long and narrow with a balcony at each end. There are many wooden fixtures dating from the 17th century. The scholar John Davies was rector of Mallwyd for 40 years at the beginning of the 17th century. There is a memorial to him in the church which was put up to commemorate the 200th anniversary of his death. Outside the church are several great yew trees.

The timber bell tower of the church is inscribed: SOLI DEO SACRUM ANNI CHRISTI MDCXL. It formerly also read VENITE CANTEM[us domino] A.D.1640 HONOR DEO IN EXCELSIS. The portals of the church, found between the church and the river, are decorated with fossil mammal bones. The black marble, octagonal font, dated below the bowl 1734, was a gift of Sir John Mytton of Dinas Mawddwy

Notable people
 John Davies (ca.1567–1644), scholar, Rector of Mallwyd 1604-44 
 Robert Foulkes (ca.1633 - 1679), clergyman and murderer.
 John Rice Jones (1759–1824), American jurist and politician 
 Rowland Williams (1779–1854), Welsh Anglican priest and writer 
 Robert Vaughn (1836-1918), Montana Rancher

References

External links

www.geograph.co.uk : photos of Mallwyd and surrounding area

Villages in Gwynedd
Villages in Snowdonia
Mawddwy